Darlene Ruth Hard (January 6, 1936 – December 2, 2021) was an American professional tennis player, known for her aggressive volleying ability and strong serves. She captured singles titles at the French Championships in 1960 and the U.S. Championships in 1960 and 1961.

With eight different partners, she won a total of 13 women's doubles titles in Grand Slam tournaments, and was the finest doubles player of her generation. Her last doubles title, at the age of 33 at the 1969 US Open, came six years after she had retired from serious competition to become a tennis instructor. She also played the US Open singles tournament in 1969, losing in the second round to Françoise Dürr.

Career

According to Lance Tingay, Hard was ranked among the top 10 in the world from 1957 through 1963, reaching a career high of No. 2 in those rankings in 1957, 1960, and 1961. The Miami Herald ranked her No. 1 for the 1961 season. In 1957, she made her first Wimbledon finals appearance, losing to Althea Gibson.

Hard was included in the year-end top-10 rankings issued by the United States Lawn Tennis Association from 1954 through 1963. Charles Friedman wrote in The New York Times that year that "as a doubles player, she has no peer." She was the top-ranked U.S. player from 1960 through 1963. With her younger doubles partner Billie Jean King, she helped the US team to victory in the 1963 Federation Cup.

Hard graduated from Pomona College in 1961, and became the first woman inducted into the college's athletic hall of fame in 1974.

She was part of the American Wightman Cup team that won the trophy against Great Britain in 1957, 1959, 1962 and 1963.

In 1964, Hard won the singles title at the South African Championships, defeating Ann Haydon-Jones in the final in straight sets, and soon afterwards turned professional when she became a teaching pro. She later owned two tennis stores.

Hard was enshrined in the International Tennis Hall of Fame in 1973.

According to a 2007 published report, she had been working for the University of Southern California since 1981 in the Publications Dept.

Personal life 
In later life, Hard lived in the Woodland Hills section of Los Angeles. She worked at the University of Southern California in the Publications Dept. for four decades, aiding in the design and fact-checking of the University Yearbook.

Hard died at the age of 85 on December 2, 2021, from complications after a fall.

Grand Slam finals

Singles: 7 (3 titles, 4 runners-up)

Doubles: 18 (13 titles, 5 runners-up)

Mixed doubles: 11 (5 titles, 6 runners-up)

Grand Slam singles performance timeline

See also
 Performance timelines for all female tennis players who reached at least one Grand Slam final

References

External links
 
 
 
 

1936 births
2021 deaths
American female tennis players
French Championships (tennis) champions
Tennis players from Los Angeles
International Tennis Hall of Fame inductees
Tennis players at the 1963 Pan American Games
United States National champions (tennis)
US Open (tennis) champions
University of Southern California people
Wimbledon champions (pre-Open Era)
Grand Slam (tennis) champions in women's singles
Grand Slam (tennis) champions in women's doubles
Grand Slam (tennis) champions in mixed doubles
Pan American Games gold medalists for the United States
Pan American Games bronze medalists for the United States
Pan American Games medalists in tennis
Pomona College alumni
Medalists at the 1963 Pan American Games
21st-century American women
World number 1 ranked female tennis players
French Open champions